Garibaldi Legion is a name associated with several military units, usually with Italian origins, and may refer to:

6th Regiment, European Brigade, commonly named Garibaldi Legion, a Confederate unit during the American Civil War
Garibaldi Legion (Poland), a Polish unit during the January Uprising
Garibaldi Legion (French Foreign Legion), a French unit during World War I

See also
Garibaldi Guard
Garibaldi Battalion
Brigate Garibaldi